Sir Robert Cavendish Spencer  (1791–1830) was an English officer of the Royal Navy. Well connected by birth, he made a naval career, which attracted the sons of the nobility and also of those from naval backgrounds, to serve under him and, despite liberal politics, worked as a reforming administrator with the future William IV of the United Kingdom.

Life
Born on 24 October 1791, he was the third son of George Spencer, 2nd Earl Spencer, and brother of John Spencer, 3rd Earl Spencer, Frederick Spencer, 4th Earl Spencer, George Spencer, and Sarah Lyttelton. In August 1804 he entered the navy on board  with Captain Benjamin Hallowell, and served under him, in Tigre and afterwards in —being promoted to be lieutenant on 13 December 1810—till appointed to command the brig , in October 1812.

In 1815 Spencer commanded  on the home station, and in 1817–1819 the 26-gun frigate  in the Mediterranean, where he conducted a negotiation with the Bey of Tunis. From 1819 to 1822 he commanded  on the South American station, and from 1823 to 1826 the 46-gun frigate  in the Mediterranean, where he took part in the operations against Algiers in the summer of 1824. He was then employed on the coast of Greece, during the Greek War of Independence.

From August 1827 to September 1828 Spencer was private secretary and Groom of the Bedchamber to the Duke of Clarence, then Lord High Admiral. They worked on naval reform, in the areas of gunnery and steam power. in October 1828 he was nominated Knight Commander of the Royal Guelphic Order, and was knighted on 24 November. In September 1828 he was appointed to command , again serving in the Mediterranean.

Death

Spencer died, off Alexandria, on 4 November 1830; he had just been recalled to the United Kingdom as surveyor-general of the ordnance. He was unmarried.

Notes

External links
Attribution

1791 births
1830 deaths
Royal Navy officers
Younger sons of earls